West New Britain Tavur, generally shortened to WNB Tavur, is an association football club based in West New Britain, a province of Papua New Guinea. The side competed for the first time in the 2013 edition of the Papua New Guinea National Soccer League, where they finished 7th out of eight teams.

History 
In december 2012, it was revealed that a side under the name of Tavur, heralding from West New Britain province, were the fourth team to pay their affiliation fees ahead of the 2013 Papua New Guinea National Soccer League season. 

Initially managed by Luke Muta, father of David Muta and Cyril Muta, the side was made up predominantly of local players, and entered the 2013 season with only two players who had accrued NSL experience in previous years. They started the season with an impressive 1–1 draw against two-time runners-up Eastern Stars, but this would not be a catalyst to a good season, with the side picking up three victories – two of which were awarded in their favour without kicking a ball – and the third of which was a 2–1 victory over Besta PNG United on 7 April 2013, by which time they were being managed by Posman Paliau. The side finished 7th in the league.

In November 2013, it was revealed that the side had twice failed to pay the affiliation fee ahead of the 2014 season, and had therefore been excluded from the upcoming season.

Domestic record

National competitions 

 Papua New Guinea National Soccer League
 2013: 7th

References

Football clubs in Papua New Guinea
Association football clubs established in 2012
2012 establishments in Papua New Guinea